General elections were held in Guatemala on 12 November 1995, with a second round of the presidential elections held on 7 January 1996. Álvaro Arzú of the National Advancement Party won the presidential election, whilst his party also won the Congressional elections. Voter turnout was 46.8% on 12 November and 36.9% on 7 January.

Results

President

Congress

References

Bibliography
Villagrán Kramer, Francisco. Biografía política de Guatemala: años de guerra y años de paz. FLACSO-Guatemala, 2004. 
Political handbook of the world 1995. New York, 1996.

Elections in Guatemala
Guatemala
1995 in Guatemala
Guatemala
1996 in Guatemala
Presidential elections in Guatemala